Nikola Sarić (born 6 January 1991) is a Danish footballer who plays for Denmark Series club AB Tårnby.

Club career

Fanø Boldklub
Sarić joined his first club Fanø Boldklub aged six while still in a Danish refugee camp, having fled Bosnia and Herzegovina during the Bosnian War.

Herfølge
Sarić joined professional club Herfølge aged 13. He spent five seasons in total with the Danish outfit, mostly in their youth system, managing to record three first team appearances in what would turn out to be his last season at the club. In 2007, Sarić was voted by the Danish Football Association to be their 2007 U-17 Player of the Year. At the age of just 14, Sarić was invited to trials at both Tottenham Hotspur and Barcelona. Both of his trials were successful and he was offered a three-year contract at Barcelona, however he and his father rejected this opportunity as it was deemed to be "too early" in his career.

During the Summer of 2008 at only 17 years of age he was sold to Liverpool, despite reported interest from the likes of Werder Bremen, Stuttgart, Bayern Munich, Ajax, AC Milan, Inter Milan and Juventus.

Liverpool
Sarić's signing for Liverpool prompted substantial news coverage. Tottenham Hotspur, Barcelona and Charlton Athletic all attempted to sign him, resulting in a bidding war. It was reported they settled on a 3-year £500,000 contract. Liverpool Daily Post called him "one of Europe's most promising young strikers" and he was compared, in style, to Zlatan Ibrahimović However, his potential was to be unfulfilled as Sarić suffered numerous injuries during his time at the club's reserves, including two broken legs and a knee problem which stunted his development. In 2011, he was released after the expiry of his contract.

Hajduk Split
After training with the club for two weeks, he signed a contract with HNK Hajduk Split on 2 June 2011. He was released by mutual consent in 2012 after financial trouble meant the club failed to pay the player his wages.

HB Køge
On 23 March 2012 he signed a contract with the Danish Superliga club HB Køge. Injury problems continued to plague his career, however, and he managed to play only 16 games in 1 year for HB Køge in all competitions. It was announced on 5 December 2013 that Sarić would leave the club at the expiry of his contract at the end of the year.

B 1908
On 17 February 2014, it was announced that Saric would train at former club B 1908 Amager to work on his fitness and return to the professional game. On 1 April 2014, it was announced that Saric would join the club permanently.

Kastrup
In 2016 he signed for Kastrup Boldklub in the Denmark Series.

AB Tårnby
In July 2021, Sarić joined Denmark Series club AB Tårnby. He made his competitive debut in the first round of the Danish Cup on 4 August against former club and rivals Tårnby FF. His team were knocked out after a penalty shootout. His league debut came three days later – also against Tårnby FF – where he was in the starting lineup of a 5–3 win.

International career
He has represented Denmark at youth level in all categories. According to Bosnian media Sarić is, as of March 2010, still undecided which country he will represent, should he come into consideration at senior international level, Denmark or Bosnia and Herzegovina.

On 27 July, Sarić declined a call-up from Croatia U21.

Personal life
Sarić was born in Sarajevo, present day Bosnia and Herzegovina to a Bosnian Serb father and a Bosnian Croat mother. He grew up as a refugee in Denmark after his family fled the country during the Yugoslav wars. He dated Serbian professional tennis player Ana Ivanovic in 2014.

References

External links
National team profile
Nikola Saric portrait 

1991 births
Living people
Footballers from Sarajevo
Bosnia and Herzegovina people of Serbian descent
Bosnia and Herzegovina people of Croatian descent
Yugoslav Wars refugees
Bosnia and Herzegovina emigrants to Denmark
Danish people of Bosnia and Herzegovina descent
Danish people of Croatian descent
Danish people of Serbian descent
Association football forwards
Bosnia and Herzegovina footballers
Danish men's footballers
Denmark youth international footballers
Herfølge Boldklub players
Liverpool F.C. players
HNK Hajduk Split players
HB Køge players
Boldklubben 1908 players
Tårnby FF players
AB Tårnby players
Danish 1st Division players
Croatian Football League players
Danish Superliga players
Danish 2nd Division players
Denmark Series players
Danish expatriate men's footballers
Expatriate footballers in England
Danish expatriate sportspeople in England
Expatriate footballers in Croatia
Danish expatriate sportspeople in Croatia